Adnan Maqsood (born 12 January 1979) is a Pakistani field hockey player. He competed at the 2004 Summer Olympics and the 2008 Summer Olympics.

References

External links
 

1979 births
Living people
Pakistani male field hockey players
Olympic field hockey players of Pakistan
Field hockey players at the 2004 Summer Olympics
Field hockey players at the 2008 Summer Olympics
Place of birth missing (living people)
Commonwealth Games medallists in field hockey
Commonwealth Games silver medallists for Pakistan
Asian Games medalists in field hockey
Asian Games bronze medalists for Pakistan
Medalists at the 2006 Asian Games
Field hockey players at the 2006 Asian Games
Field hockey players at the 2006 Commonwealth Games
21st-century Pakistani people
2006 Men's Hockey World Cup players
Medallists at the 2006 Commonwealth Games